Mary FitzAlan, Duchess of Norfolk (1540 – 23/25 August 1557) was an English translator.

She was the youngest daughter and child of Henry FitzAlan, 12th Earl of Arundel and his first wife Lady Katherine Grey, therefore Mary was a first cousin of Henry Grey, 1st Duke of Suffolk, father of Lady Jane Grey. Because her only brother had predeceased her, she and her elder sister, Jane FitzAlan were co-heiresses to the earldom of her father. Mary and Jane both received an excellent education. Several of her translations from Greek to Latin have been preserved.

Mary was the first wife of Thomas Howard, 4th Duke of Norfolk, whom she married in 1555. They had one son, Philip Howard, 13th Earl of Arundel, born the following year.  Mary died eight weeks after the birth of Philip at Arundel House.  She was buried on 1 September 1557 in St Clement Danes.

Upon the death of her father in 1580, the earldom of Arundel passed to Mary's son Philip, all of his aunt Jane's children having predeceased her, and Jane having predeceased her father Henry.

Ancestry

References

1541 births
1557 deaths
Daughters of British earls
Mary
16th-century English women
Mary
Mary